Events from the year 1851 in the United States.

Incumbents

Federal Government 
 President: Millard Fillmore (W-New York)
 Vice President: vacant
 Chief Justice: Roger B. Taney (Maryland)
 Speaker of the House of Representatives: Howell Cobb (D-Georgia) (until March 4), Linn Boyd (D-Kentucky) (starting December 1)
 Congress: 31st (until March 4), 32nd (starting March 4)

Events

January–March
 January 15 – Christian Female College, later Columbia College, receives its charter from the Missouri General Assembly.
 January 23 – The flip of a coin determines whether a new city in the Oregon Territory is named after Boston, Massachusetts, or Portland, Maine, with Portland winning.
 January 28 – The Illinois General Assembly grants a charter to create Northwestern University.

April–June
 April 9 – San Luis, the oldest permanent settlement in the state of Colorado, is founded by settlers from Taos, New Mexico.
 April 28 – Santa Clara College is chartered in Santa Clara, California.
 May–August – The Great Flood of 1851 causes extensive damage in the Midwest; the town of Des Moines is virtually destroyed.
 May 6 – John Gorrie of Apalachicola, Florida is granted Patent No. 8080 for a machine to make ice.
 May 15 – Alpha Delta Pi sorority, the first secret society for women, is founded at Wesleyan College in Macon, Georgia.
 May 29 – Sojourner Truth delivers the first version of her "Ain't I a Woman?" speech, at the Women's Rights Convention in Akron, Ohio.

July–September
 July 10 – The University of the Pacific is chartered as California Wesleyan College in Santa Clara, California.
 August 1 – Virginia closes its Reform Constitutional Convention deciding that all white men have the right to vote.
 August 3 – The filibustering Lopez Expedition departs New Orleans for Cuba.
 August 22 – The yacht America of the New York Yacht Club wins the first America's Cup race, off the coast of England.
 September 15 – Saint Joseph's University is founded in Philadelphia, Pennsylvania.
 September 18 – The New York Times is founded.

October–December
 October 15 – The City of Winona, Minnesota is founded.
 November 13 – The Denny Party lands at Alki Point, the first settlers of what later becomes Seattle, Washington.
 November 14 – Herman Melville's novel Moby-Dick; or The Whale is published in the U.S. by Harper & Brothers, New York, after being first published on October 18 in London by Richard Bentley, in 3 volumes as The Whale.
 December 29 – The first YMCA opens in Boston, Massachusetts.

Undated
 Western Union is founded as the New York and Mississippi Valley Printing Telegraph Company.
 House sparrows first released in the U.S., in Brooklyn.
 Stephen Foster's minstrel song "Old Folks at Home" is first published.
 Hope College is established in Holland, Michigan, as the Pioneer School by Dutch immigrants.

Ongoing
 California Gold Rush (1848–1855)

Births
 January 17 – A. B. Frost, illustrator (died 1928)
 January 19 – David Starr Jordan, ichthyologist, educator, eugenicist and peace activist (died 1924)
 January 24 – Marcus A. Smith, U.S. Senator from Arizona from 1912 to 1921 (died 1924)
 February 2 – Ella Giles Ruddy, author and essayist (died 1917)
 February 9 – Nora Trueblood Gause, humanitarian (died 1955)
 February 13 – Joseph B. Murdock, U.S. Navy admiral and New Hampshire politician (died 1931)
 March 14 – John Sebastian Little, politician, congressman (died 1916)
 March 19 – William Henry Stark, business leader (died 1936)
 March 26 – John Eisenmann, Cleveland architect (died 1924)
 April 13
 Robert Abbe, surgeon (died 1928)
 Helen M. Winslow, editor, author and publisher (died 1938)
 May 14 – Anna Laurens Dawes, author and suffragist (died 1938)
 May 15 – Lillian Resler Keister Harford, church organizer and editor (died 1935)
 May 21 – Moses E. Clapp, U.S. Senator from Minnesota from 1901 to 1917 (died 1929)
 May 29 – Fred Dubois, U.S. Senator from Idaho from 1891 to 1897 and from 1901 to 1907 (died 1930)
 June 24 – Stuyvesant Fish, entrepreneur (died 1923)
 August 12 – Frank O. Briggs, U.S. Senator from New Jersey from 1907 to 1913 (died 1913)
 August 14 – Doc Holliday, born John H. Holliday, gunfighter, gambler and dentist (died 1887)
 September 7 – David King Udall, politician (died 1938)
 September 13 – Walter Reed, army physician, bacteriologist (died 1902)
 September 21 – Fanny Searls (died 1939), doctor and botanist.
 October 5 – Thomas Pollock Anshutz, painter and educator (died 1912) 
 October 13 – Charles Sprague Pearce, painter (died 1914)
 October 20 – George Gandy, entrepreneur (died 1946)
 November 16
 Minnie Hauk, operatic soprano (died 1929)
 William Elbridge Sewell, naval officer and Governor of Guam (died 1904)
 December 9 – Thomas H. Paynter, U.S. Senator from Kentucky from 1907 to 1913 (died 1921)
 December 10 – Melvil Dewey, born Melville Dewey, librarian (died 1931)
 December 30 – Asa Griggs Candler, businessman and politician (died 1929)
 Albery Allson Whitman, African American poet (died 1901)

Deaths
 January 17 – Thomas Lincoln, farmer and father of the President of the United States Abraham Lincoln (born 1778)
 January 27 – John James Audubon, naturalist and illustrator (born 1785 in Saint-Domingue)
 January 31 – David Spangler Kaufman, Congressman from Texas (born 1813)
 February 3 – Benjamin Williams Crowninshield, Congressman from Massachusetts, secretary of U.S. Navy (born 1772)
 March 11 – George McDuffie, 55th Governor of South Carolina from 1842 to 1846 (born 1790)
 May 3 – Thomas Hickman Williams, U.S. Senator from Mississippi from 1838 to 1839 (born 1801)
 May 22 – Mordecai Manuel Noah, Jewish playwright, diplomat, journalist and utopian (born 1785)
 July 6 – Thomas Davenport, electrical engineer (born 1802)
 August 24 – James McDowell, politician (born 1795)
 September 10 – Thomas Hopkins Gallaudet, minister, educator, co-founder of the first permanent school for the deaf in North America (born 1787)
 September 11 – Sylvester Graham, nutritionist and inventor (born 1794)
 September 14 – James Fenimore Cooper, historical novelist (born 1789)
 September 24 – Lucius Lyon, U.S. Senator from Michigan from 1843 to 1845 (born 1800)
 November – Willis Buell, politician and portrait painter (born 1790)

See also
Timeline of United States history (1820–1859)

References

External links
 

 
1850s in the United States
United States
United States
Years of the 19th century in the United States